London International Airport  is located  northeast of the city of London, Ontario, Canada.

In 2018, the airport handled 514,685 passengers, and, in 2011, was the 20th busiest in Canada in terms of aircraft movements, with 94,747. Air Canada Express and WestJet provide year-round flights to London International Airport. It also provides services for cargo airlines.

The airport is classified as an airport of entry by Nav Canada and is staffed by the Canada Border Services Agency (CBSA). CBSA officers at this airport can handle aircraft with no more than 180 passengers; however, they can handle up to 450 if the aircraft is unloaded in stages.

History

London Airport, 1929-1942

In January 1927 the City of London selected a site for an airfield at Lambeth, Ontario near ; the adjacent section of Wonderland Road to the east between Southdale and Exeter was named Airport Road up through 1989 when the town of Westminster was established and all rural roads were named by the town. A group of local businessmen acquired the site in 1928 and by 3 May 1929 an airport license was issued to London Airport Ltd. The London Flying Club was formed in 1928 and became a tenant of the new airport. The airfield was used for flying instruction, private aviation, and for air mail. By 1933 it had become too small for some commercial aircraft.

The London Flying Club continued to use the Lambeth airfield until 7 August 1942.

London City Airport, 1940-1945

In 1935 the city decided to replace the original London Airport. Site surveys and consultations took place and on 9 September 1939, at the start of World War II, work began on a new airport located near Crumlin. The city leased the new airport to the Government of Canada, Department of Transport on 24 January 1940 for the duration of the war.

Runways 14-32 and 05-23 were paved and ready for use by July 1940 and the Royal Canadian Air Force established RCAF Station Crumlin on part of the airport. This air station was host to No. 3 Elementary Flying Training School (EFTS) and No. 4 Air Observer School (AOS), both part of the British Commonwealth Air Training Plan.

The airport remained under civilian management and was used for civil and military aviation during the war years. The licence for London City Airport was issued on 6 May 1941. Improvements made during this time include:

 main terminal building (civilian) opened in July 1942
 Trans-Canada Airlines began serve to the airport in July 1942.
 runway 08-26 added in 1943.

British Commonwealth Air Training Plan operations ended on 31 December 1944 with the closure of No. 4 Air Observer School.

The Royal Air Force Transport Command, No. 45 Group established the Mosquito Preparation and Despatching Unit at London on 10 January 1945. This detachment had twenty three members and test flew De Havilland Mosquitos built in Toronto before they were flown overseas.

After the war the airport remained under the control of the Department of Transport.

Aerodrome information 
Two runways were listed as follows:

Postwar RCAF operations 1945-1961

After World War II RCAF reserve or auxiliary squadrons were given the task of defending Canada's major cities. 420 Squadron reformed as City of London 420 (Fighter) Auxiliary Squadron at the airport in September 1948. Initially equipped with Harvard aircraft, the squadron upgraded to Mustangs in 1952 and Canadair CT-133 jets in 1954. The squadron disbanded in 1957. Air Defence Command reformed 2420 Aircraft Control and Warning (Auxiliary) Squadron at London on 1 July 1956. 2420 trained Fighter Control operators and disbanded on 31 May 1961.

RCAF Station London opened in 1950 to support a NATO Induction and Training Centre, later moved to Centralia. The station closed on 30 September 1958.

As a tribute to this period, a Canadair CT-133 aircraft in former Royal Canadian Air Force livery is mounted in front of the main terminal building.

Development since 1950

The airport has been continuously improved since World War II as navigation and air traffic control systems evolved, and as commercial aircraft became larger and larger. These improvements include:

 1950, installation of the Instrument Landing System (ILS) on runway 14-32
 1955, runway 14-32 lengthened to 6,000 feet to accommodate the Vickers Viscount
 1960, Meteorological Branch weather station opened
 1965, new terminal building opened
 1968, Air Canada begins DC-9 jet service
 1974, runway 14-32 lengthened to 8,800 feet to accommodate DC-8, Boeing 707 and 747, and L-1011 aircraft
 1988, runway 05-23 decommissioned
 1990, new radar system installed
 1998, control of the airport was transferred from Transport Canada to the Greater London International Airport Authority
 2003, main terminal building completely renovated and expanded
2019, taxiway G is completely rebuilt

Airlines and destinations

Passenger

Other tenants
 CHC Helicopter - Ornge (Ontario Air Ambulance)
 Jet Aircraft Museum - currently operates six Canadair CT-133 Silver Stars, otherwise known as the T-bird
 Executive Aviation - World Fuel Services-affiliated fixed-base operator
 Trek Aviation - aircraft maintenance and consulting services
 Flite Line Services London - Shell-affiliated fixed-base operator
 Diamond Aircraft - light aircraft manufacturer
 Discovery Air - niche flight services
 Diamond Flight Centre - flight training school
 Forest City Flight Centre - flight training school
 AFS Aerial Photography - aerial photography services
 427 (London) Wing - Air Force Association of Canada
 International Test Pilots School

London International Airport Fire Crash and Rescue Station provides fire and rescue operations at the airport with three crash tenders based on Blair Boulevard.

Statistics

Annual traffic

Ground transportation
Shuttle service is available for passengers wishing to connect to flights at Toronto Pearson International Airport in Toronto.

London Transit Commission provides service between the airport and Fanshawe College.

Airshow London
The airport is home to the annual "Airshow London", the largest military airshow in Canada. It showcases military aircraft from the Canadian and United States Air Forces.

See also
 List of airports in the London, Ontario area

Notes

References

External links

Official website

Certified airports in Ontario
Transport in London, Ontario
Buildings and structures in London, Ontario
Companies based in London, Ontario
National Airports System
Airports established in 1929
1929 establishments in Ontario